Walter Powers may refer to:

 Walter Powers (musician), American bass guitarist
 Walter Powers (politician) (1895–1954), accountant and political figure in New Brunswick, Canada
 Walter W. Powers, politician in California
 Walter Powers II (1639–1708), co-founder of Littleton, Massachusetts, ancestor of two Revolutionary War patriots